Chile competed at the 1984 Winter Olympics in Sarajevo, Yugoslavia after missing the 1980 Winter Olympics.

Alpine skiing

Men

References
Official Olympic Reports
 Olympic Winter Games 1984, full results by sports-reference.com

Nations at the 1984 Winter Olympics
1984
Winter Olympics